Geochang County (Geochang-gun) is a county in South Gyeongsang Province, South Korea.  The Geochang International Festival of Theater, which was started in 1989, is renowned as the best play festival in Korea.  The District Office is located in Geochang-eup, and has jurisdiction over 1 eup and 11 myeon.

The origin of Geochang's name
Geocheang Country (Geochang-gun, Korean pronunciation) has been called Geoyeol, Geota and Arim since ancient times, in the meaning of a large bright place, a very wide field, a wide field, or a large bright one. It was first called a Geochang in the 16th year of King Gyeongdeok of Silla in 757 and was called a geochang after being divided and annexed by surrounding cities.

History 
At the beginning of the Shilla Dynasty was referred to as Gayeol.
1896 Gyeongsangnam-do, Geochang-gun
1928 Gadong-myeon and Gaseo-myeon consolidated into Gajo-myeon.
1931 Eupwoe-myeon renamed to Wolcheon-myeon.
1937 Geochang-myeon elevated to Geochang-eup.
1957 Wolcheon-myeon consolidated into Geochang-eup.

Festivals 

 Keochang International Festival of Theatre (KIFT)

In Korea, it is called the four major theatrical festivals along with Ansan Street Arts Festival, Puppet Festival Chuncheon, and Andong Maskdance Festival.

It is an international theater festival that is held every July and August under the theme of "Nature, Humanity, and Drama".

Twin towns and districts
Geochang is twinned with:

  Gokseong, South Korea (1998)
  Gangdong-gu, South Korea (1999)
  Gaoyou, China (2005)
  Yeongdo-gu, South Korea (2006)
  Suseong-gu, South Korea (2006)
  Seocho-gu, South Korea (2007)

Climate
Geochang has a humid continental climate (Köppen: Dwa), but can be considered a borderline humid subtropical climate (Köppen: Cwa) using the  isotherm.

Geography
Geochang-gun is situated at the far west side of Gyeongsangnam-do, and faces Gyeongsangbuk-do and Jeollanam-do.  It does not have good transportation access.

Administrative Regions 
The administrative region of Geochang-gun is made up of Geochang-eup, and 11 myeons.  With an area of 804.14 km2, it occupies 7.65% of Gyeongsangnam-do.  As of August 2012, it has a population of 27,111 households, or 63,122 people, with 62.4% residing in Geochang-eup.  Its highest ever population was 125,995, which was much higher than present day Changwon-si.

Notable people from Geochang County
 Shin Yong-Mok (Hangul: 신용목), South Korean poet
 Choi Ri (Hangul: 최리), South Korean actress
 Shin Mi-hwa (Hangul: 신미화), South Korean bobsledder
 Kim Tae-ho (Hangul: 김태호), South Korean politician
 Shin Dalja (Hangul: 신달자), South Korean poet
 V (Real Name: Kim Tae-hyung, Hangul: 김태형), singer-songwriter, member of K-pop boygroup BTS (Originally from Seo-gu, Daegu, South Korea)

See also
Geochang massacre

References

External links

County government website

 
Counties of South Gyeongsang Province